The Zamfara State House of Assembly is the legislative chamber of Zamfara State in Nigeria.

References

See also 

State legislatures of Nigeria
Politics of Zamfara State